Varis Brasla (born 25 April 1939) is a Latvian film director.

Since 1965 he worked in Riga Film Studio. Several of his films, including Emil's Mischiefs and Waterbomb for the Fat Tomcat were awarded with the Latvian National Film Prize award as the best film of the year.

He was awarded the Order of Three Stars in 2009.

Selected filmography

Director filmography

Other:
 Brick Kiln (1972) (second unit director)
 In the Shadow of Death (1971) (assistant director)
 Four White Shirts/Breathe Deeply (1967) (second unit director)

References

External links

1939 births
Living people
Latvian film directors
Soviet film directors
Lielais Kristaps Award winners
Film people from Riga